Vibha Bakshi (born 23 September 1970) is an Indian filmmaker, journalist, and founder of Responsible Films. She is known for her films that highlight issues of gender inequality. Vibha's most notable films as both director and producer include Daughters of Mother India and Son Rise. Both films are winners of the National Film Awards from the President of India. She is the recipient of four National Film Awards from the President of India.

Vibha has been awarded the Honorary Doctor of Humane Letters by the Boston University in 2018 for her work as a journalist and filmmaker.

Early life and education
Vibha was born on 23 September 1970 in Mumbai, India. Her father, Ved Chhabra, is a businessman and was named among the Top 100 business leaders by Forbes in 2018, and her mother Geeta Chhabra, is a poet and writer. Vibha attended Convent of Jesus and Mary and St Xaviers College, Mumbai. She went to the United States for her undergraduate study in Journalism and Broadcasting. She graduated with a Bachelor of science degree in Communication from Boston University in 1993 and completed a diploma course on broadcasting at New York University in 1999.

Career 
Vibha started her career in broadcast journalism with Plus Channel, Mumbai. She later joined CNBC (India) as part of GE's founding team.

In 2004, Vibha became co-producer with Oscar winner Maryann DeLeo. Their films include Terror at Home (2005) for Lifetime TV and was part of the United States Government's Emmy Award-winning campaign to stop violence against women – and HBO's film Too Hot NOT to Handle (2006) on the issue of Global warming.

Her work includes short films on the jewel palaces of India for Taj Hotels, including for Falaknuma Palace, Lake Udaipur Palace, Umaid Bhawan Palace, and Rambagh Palace.

Vibha's film for the Tata Medical Centre, Kolkata, a ₹4 billion philanthropy initiative funded by Tata Trusts and led by Ratan Tata, was aired across 29 channels in India in English and 9 regional languages.

She directed and produced the Women Safety Campaign for the Mumbai Police in 2015. She was felicitated by the Chief Minister of Maharashtra Devendra Fadnavis for this work.

Her latest gender rights films Son Rise and Daughters of Mother India are changing the narrative on gender inequality and gender justice globally.

Daughters of Mother India 
Vibha's film Daughters of Mother India, won the 62nd National Film Awards in 2015 for Best Film on Social Issues. As director and producer, she received two awards from the President of India, Pranab Mukherjee. National Film Awards Jury described the film for turning the spotlight on the burning issue of rape and gender violence in the country. The film had a prime-time simulcast release in India across Viacom 18's 10 channels in 8 languages, a first for a documentary film in India.

In 2017, Global Creative Index rated Daughters of Mother India as the Most Awarded PR Program in the World. Vibha's film was nominated at the Cannes Glass Lions award for 'Media Advocacy that Changed the World'. Daughters of Mother India was screened for over  officers of the Indian Police Force as a gender-sensitization and training tool for the Police to deal with gender-related crimes. It has also been incorporated into the curriculum of 200 schools in Maharashtra.

Daughters of Mother India was selected as the opening film at the Indian Panorama during the 46th International Film Festival of India (IFFI), held in November 2015 in Goa. The festival was hosted by the Ministry of Information and Broadcasting and the Directorate of Film Festivals.

Son Rise 
Son Rise follows men from India’s seat of patriarchy, Haryana who are trying to break the shackles of patriarchy and fight for women's rights. Vibha has been awarded the 66th National Film Awards for Best Film Non-Feature as both director and producer, the highest honour for cinema in the country. Son Rise also won Best Editing Non-Feature. In 2021, Son Rise was selected by United Nations, to be screened as part of UN Women’s global HeForShe campaign across 71 countries. The film was unveiled by United Nations Under-Secretary-General Phumzile Mlambo-Ngcuka followed by screenings by Consulates and Embassies of the World in India.

The film kicked off the inaugural Bloomberg Equality Summit in Mumbai, the first in Asia. Son Rise was the official selection for the Indian Panorama section at the 50th International Film Festival of India, Goa.

The film won the Jury Award for Best Documentary at the Mumbai International Film Festival and Best Documentary at the New York Indian Film Festival.

Son Rise was recently screened at World Expo 2020, Dubai's largest venue, Jubilee stage. The screening was followed by a call of action by 50 countries who pledged for gender equality - led by United Nations, New Zealand, India and the Women’s Pavilion at Expo 2020. The event was attended by the cultural figures, diplomatic community, business leaders, academics and change-makers to spotlight a shared human rights and women’s rights issue — violence against women.

Awards and nominations 
In 2018, Bakshi was awarded the Honorary Doctor of Humane Letters from her alma mater Boston University for her work as a journalist and filmmaker. She was the commencement speaker at Boston University's School of Communications. Vibha is the winner of the Vogue India - Women of the Year - 2021 Award for her films that have contributed towards gender equality and gender justice globally.

Personal life 
Vibha is married to Vishal Bakshi, former Goldman Sachs Head Private Equity India and now founder of Private Equity firm Avatar Growth Capital Partners. The couple has two boys, Varun and Vir.

References

External links 

 Vibha Bakshi
 

Living people
Boston University alumni
Directors who won the Best Film on Other Social Issues National Film Award
Producers who won the Best Film on Other Social Issues National Film Award
Indian documentary filmmakers
Indian women documentary filmmakers
Indian women television journalists
Indian women journalists
National Film Award (India) winners
Film directors from Mumbai
Film producers from Mumbai
1970 births